Kargı District is a district of the Çorum Province of Turkey. Its seat is the town of Kargı. Its area is 1,174 km2, and its population is 15,464 (2022).

Composition
There is one municipality in Kargı District:
 Kargı

There are 58 villages in Kargı District:

 Abdullah
 Akçataş
 Akkaya
 Akkise
 Alioğlu
 Arık
 Avşar
 Bademce
 Bağözü
 Başköy
 Bayat
 Beygircioğlu
 Bozarmut
 Çakırlar
 Çalköy
 Çeltiközü
 Çetmi
 Cihadiye
 Çobankaya
 Çobanlar
 Çukuralıç
 Demirören
 Dereköy
 Gökbudak
 Gökçedoğan
 Gölet
 Göletdere
 Gölköy
 Gümüşoğlu
 Güneyköy
 Günyazı
 Hacıhamza
 Hacıveli
 Halılar
 İnceçay
 Kabakçı
 Karaboya
 Karacaoğlan
 Karakese
 Karaosmanlı
 Karapürçek
 Kavakçayı
 Köprübaşı
 Koyunkıran
 Maksutlu
 Oğuzköy
 Örencik
 Pelitçik
 Pelitözü
 Saraçlar
 Saraycık
 Sekiköy
 Sinanözü
 Sünlük
 Tepelice
 Uzunyurt
 Yağcılar
 Yeşilköy

References

Districts of Çorum Province